The Mitscher-class destroyer was an experimental destroyer class of four ships that were built for the United States Navy shortly after World War II.  Considerably larger than all previous destroyers, but smaller than their immediate predecessor, the experimental Norfolk, they would have been the first post-war destroyer class had they not been reclassified during construction as destroyer leaders (DL). Commissioned in 1953–1954, two of the class served until 1969, and were scrapped in the 1970s. The other two were converted into guided missile destroyers (DDG), served until 1978, and were sold for scrap by 1980.

Description
All four Mitscher-class ships were designed under project SCB 5 and ordered 3 August 1948. They were named for admirals of the Second World War.

Beyond that, each ship had a different loadout of propulsion and other systems so as to determine the best course of action for future destroyer design. 

The Mitscher class would become the winner in internal Navy debates over competing designs, even as an early concept in 1945. With their development the CL-154 class anti aircraft cruisers would be canceled, and no further Norfolks would be built; in both cases the decisions were made on cost-effectiveness grounds.

In the early 1960s, the Mitscher class underwent modernization through a Class Improvement Program (CIP), which included the replacement of the boilers on the first two ships of the class.

DDG conversions
The first two ships, Mitscher and John S. McCain, were converted into guided missile destroyers under SCB 241 in the mid-1960s. They were redesignated as DDG-35 and DDG-36, respectively.

Ships in class

See also
List of United States Navy destroyer leaders

References

Notes

Sources

External links

Destroyer classes